This is a list of presidential proclamations by George W. Bush, the president of the United States from 2001 to 2009, which is a subset of the longer list of executive actions by George W. Bush.

Presidential proclamations

2001

2002

2008

2009

See also
 List of executive actions by Bill Clinton, EO #12834–13197 (1993–2001)
 List of executive actions by Barack Obama, EO #13489–13764 (2009–2017)
 List of executive actions by George W. Bush

References

Sources

External links
 Federal Archives
 Federal Register
 GPO's Federal Digital System (FDsys) - Bulk Data, Download multiple issues of the Federal Register or latest Code of Federal Regulations in XML.
 George W. Bush Presidential Center

 
United States federal policy
George W. Bush-related lists